Frederick Stanley Sefton (August 7, 1888 – March 11, 1976) was an American football, basketball, and baseball and college athletics administrator. He served as the head football coach at the University of Akron for nine seasons, from 1915 to 1923, compiling a record of 33–34–4. Sefton also coached the men's basketball team at Akron for a total of 11 seasons, nine from 1916 to 1924 and two more from 1925 to 1927, tallying a total mark of 103–42. He played college football at Colgate University.

Sefton died on March 11, 1976, at Akron General Medical Center in Akron, Ohio.

Head coaching record

Football

Basketball

References

1888 births
1976 deaths
Akron Zips athletic directors
Akron Zips baseball coaches
Akron Zips football coaches
Akron Zips men's basketball coaches
Basketball coaches from Massachusetts
Colgate Raiders football players
Sportspeople from Holyoke, Massachusetts